Women in ancient Egypt had some special rights other women did not have in other comparable societies. They could own property and were, at court, legally equal to men. However, Ancient Egypt was a society dominated by men. Only a few women are known to have important positions in administration, though there were female rulers and even female pharaohs. Women at the royal court gained their positions by relationship to male kings.

Work 

Most women belonged to the peasantry and worked alongside their husbands. Women were known to manage farms or businesses in the absence of their husbands or sons. Among the upper classes of society, a woman usually did not work outside the home, and instead supervised the servants of the household and her children's education. An exception is the textile industry. Here women are well attested as weavers. A letter found at Lahun and dating around 1800 BC names six female weavers.

In the Old Kingdom wealthy women often owned their own households. There was working men and women side by side, and it is not uncommon to find in the staff of a women's household other women with administrative titles. Especially in tomb scenes of the periods, men are often served by men, while women are served by women. Here, the separation of sexes is visible.

Women belonging to families wealthy enough to hire nannies to help with childcare frequently worked as perfume-makers and also were employed in courts and temples, like acrobats, dancers, singers, and musicians, which were all considered respectable pursuits for upper-class women. Women belonging to any class could work as professional mourners or musicians, and these were common jobs. Noblewomen could be members of the priesthood connected to either a god or goddess. Women could even be at the head of a business as, for example, the lady Nenofer of the New Kingdom, and could also be a doctor, as the lady Peseshet during the Fourth dynasty of Egypt.

Family and marriage

Marriage 
The purpose of marriage was to have more children and descendants of the family.

In the New Kingdom, there was a saying that:

"Take a wife while you are young

That she make a son for you

She should care for you while you are youthful 

It is proper to make people

Happy is the man whose people are many

He is saluted on account of his progeny."

It is true that some egalitarian relationships between husband and wife were implied in Egyptian depictions.

For example, in love songs, brother and sister carried the same significance as husband and wife.  "Sn", the Egyptian word for "brother", also meant "peer", "mate", or  "second". Thus, the love songs may be referring to the egalitarian relationship between husband and wife. The example for interbreeding among royalty was set by the gods since Osiris married his sister, Isis. 

However, depictions usually show a husband and wife in an affectionate attitude with their children, so we assume most families were generally happy, but marriage was more realistic. The wife shared responsibilities and worked with her husband. Marriages in ancient Egypt were usually monogamous, but it also was not uncommon for a man of high economic status to have more than one wife. This was especially true if the man's first wife was unable to have children of her own. Although it was possible to divorce, it was very difficult. Marriages were usually arranged by parents, who chose appropriate partners for their children. Despite what the laws stated, it was suggested that women made more family decisions and controlled more of the home than usual. Women had control over most of their property, could serve as legal persons who brought cases to the court, and even worked in public. Husbands did not take total control over their wives property because women had a degree of independence in ancient Egypt. For example, from ca. 365 B.C, a new marriage contract was emerged which mainly protected women from divorce, placing more financial burdens on men. 

The influence of queens and queen mothers was considered as a big reason for women's special rights in ancient Egypt compared to other societies at that time. Queens and queen mothers always had a great power since many pharaohs were very young when they succeeded the throne. For example, the great pharaoh Ahmose I in New Kingdom, always took advice from his mother, Ahhotep I, and his principal wife, Nefertari. 

Although the women of ancient Egypt were viewed as one of the most independent groups of women, widowhood could result in suspicion due to the lack of male control. Widows also gained more legal freedom, being able to buy and sell land, making donations, and even making loans.

Pregnancy 

There is much evidence of complex beliefs and practices in ancient Egypt related to the important role fertility played in society. If a woman was not fertile, her husband could potentially divorce her for not producing heirs. Religious beliefs included rules concerning purification, similar to other religions in the region. Women in Egypt were believed to be eliminating impure elements during menstruation, and were excused from work and could not enter the restricted rooms of temples while menstruating. Fertility rituals were used by couples desiring children. Contraception was permitted as well, and medical texts survive that refer to many contraceptive formulas (although the ingredients are often now difficult to identify). Some formulas, such as drinks made of celery base and beer, are dubious, but others show a basic knowledge of somewhat effective methods, such as a spermicide made of fermented acacia gum, which produces a sperm-killing lactic acid.

Once pregnant, the uterus was placed under the protection of a specific goddess, Tenenet. Ritual medical care was given by anointing the woman's body with beneficial oils, using a small bottle in the form of a woman posed with her hands placed on a round belly. There was a way in the Ancient Egyptian society for families who wanted to know the sex of their baby, which spread to Greece, Byzantium, and then to Europe, where it was practiced for centuries without anyone realizing its origins in ancient Egypt. It involves placing grains of barley and wheat in a cloth sachet and soaking them in the pregnant woman's urine; if barley sprouted first, the baby was said to be a boy, and if the wheat sprouted first, the baby was said to be a girl. In ancient Egypt, the word for barley was the synonym of "father".

Childbirth 
When it was time for childbirth, the pregnant woman was assisted by midwives. She would be shaved, including her head. The midwives would support the woman during labor while she remained in a squatting position on a mat. On the corners of the mat were placed four bricks, believed to be the incarnation of four goddesses: Nut, the great goddess of the sky; Tefnut, the elder, the feminine polarity of the first couple; Aset the beautiful; and Nebet-Het, the excellent.

Women playing an official role at the highest levels 

There are few preserved examples of women as high officials. Some women are known to have become Pharaohs. One example of a woman in a high state position is Nebet who became vizier in the Sixth Dynasty. The vizier was the highest state official, second only to the king.

Egyptian society of antiquity, like many other civilizations of the time, used religion as a foundation for society. This was how the throne of the power of the Pharaohs was justified, as anointed by the gods, and the holder of the throne had a divine right. Typically, in ancient societies power was transferred from one male to the next. Women gave birth to the heirs, signaling importance towards marriage, as well. The son inherited the power, and in cases where the king did not have a son, the throne was then inherited by the male members of the family further removed from the king, such as cousins or uncles. In this system, daughters did not automatically inherit power. 

In Egyptian civilization, this obligation of passing power to a male successor was not without exceptions. Royal blood, a factor determined by divine legitimacy, was the unique criteria for access to the throne. However, the divine essence was transmitted to the royal spouse, as was the case with Nefertiti, wife of Akhenaton.

Egyptians preferred to be governed by a woman with royal blood (being divine according to mythology) rather than by a man who did not have royal blood. Also, during crises of succession, there were women who took power. When this happened, the female Pharaoh adopted all of the masculine symbols of the throne. There even exist doubts, in some instances, about the sex of certain Pharaohs who could have been women.

During the Eighteenth dynasty of Egypt, when Amenhotep I died, his successor Thutmose I appears to have not been his son, at least he was not the child of a secondary wife of the late Pharaoh; if his wife Ahmes was related to Amenhotep I, this union permitted divine legitimacy. For the following successor, princess Hatshepsut, daughter of Thutmose I and the Great Royal Wife, enabled Thutmose II, son of his second wife and therefore half-brother of the princess, to gain the throne by marrying him.

It became more common for women to gain the throne in ancient Egypt. For example, as with Hatshepsut, who took the place of her nephew Thutmose III. When Hatshepsut inherited the throne from her late husband and became Pharaoh, her daughter Neferure took on a role that exceeded the normal duties of a royal princess, acquiring a more queenly role. There were also the Cleopatras, of whom the best known is Cleopatra VII (69 BCE to 30 BCE), famous for her beauty and her relationships with Julius Caesar and then Marc Antony, the leaders who depended upon her throne.

The women Pharaohs who are best known, and of whom historians are most certain, are:
 Nitocris (Sixth dynasty of Egypt)
 Sobekneferu (Twelfth dynasty of Egypt),
 Hatshepsut (Eighteenth dynasty of Egypt),
 Neferneferuaten (Eighteenth dynasty of Egypt),
 Twosret (Nineteenth dynasty of Egypt).

Many of the Great Royal Wives also played significant diplomatic and political roles:
 Tiyi wife of (Amenhotep III)
 Nefertiti wife of (Amenhotep IV)
 Nefertari wife of (Ramses II)

Elsewhere in the New Kingdom, the Great Wife was often invested with a divine role: "Wife of god", "Hand of god". Hatshepsut was the first Great wife (of Thutmose II) to receive this latter title.

For women holding office in the highest levels of the bureaucracy, one can cite Nebet, a Vizir in ancient Egypt during the Sixth dynasty of Egypt. It is necessary to recognize that a woman at such a high level of authority remained extremely rare and it was not until the Twenty-sixth dynasty of Egypt that a similar situation can be found. Women did, however, occupy numerous offices such as scribe in the bureaucracy, except during the New Kingdom, where all public bureaucracy posts were filled by men.

There was also the Divine Adoratrice of Amun, granted major spiritual power, but also a power restricted to Thebes.

"Royal harem"

There has been a modern trend to refer to the women's quarters of the Pharaoh's palace in Ancient Egypt as a harem.

The popular assumption that Pharaonic Egypt had a harem is however an anachronism; while the women and children of the pharaoh, including his mother, wives, and children, had their own living quarters with its own administration in the Palace of the Pharaoh, the royal women did not live isolated from contact with men or in seclusion from the rest of the court in the way associated with the term "harem". 

The custom of referring to the women's quarters of the pharaoh's palace as a "harem" is therefore apocryphal, and has been used because of incorrect assumptions that Ancient Egypt was similar to later Islamic harem culture.

Women in ancient Egyptian literature 

Literature of ancient Egypt did include depictions of women as frivolous, capricious, and untrustworthy. However, women benefitted from a status that has been described as rare in the civilizations of the time.

While the painters and sculptors gave to women a serene image as part of a happy family, writers sometimes portrayed women as being the origin of misfortune and guilty of sins. 

Gaston Maspero describes in Contes populaires (Popular Tales), there was the fatal misadventure of Bytaou, the humble farmhand at the home of his brother Anoupou. Seduced by the wife of his brother, he succumbs to the charm of her beauty. She does not hesitate to denounce him to Anoupou, lying and never ceasing until she obtains the ultimate punishment for Bytaou at the hands of Anoupou. But she is punished in turn; Anoupou discovers much later that he has been played for a fool by his wife, who he kills, and throws her body to the dogs.

It is important not to interpret this incorrectly: the rarely flattering portrayal of women in Egyptian literature does not reveal for nothing that women were despised. The Pharaoh was often given the same treatment by storytellers who presented the Pharaoh as a stubborn and whimsical character.

Men were invited to cherish their wives. Ptahhotep (Third dynasty of Egypt) expressed this in the following maxim (written in the Papyrus Prisse): "You must love your wife with all your heart, [...], make her heart happy as long as you live".

Romance was present in Egyptian literature, for example, in a papyrus at the Leyden Museum:

Women in ancient Egyptian art 

Egyptian women were seldom depicted as ageing and wrinkled; there were standards to be met. The women were shown as slender and beautiful, partly so that they could take on that frame in the afterlife. Egyptian art was far from realistic. It shows how much the ancient Egyptians cared about how they were perceived. There were hardly any images of pregnant women or women's bodies after giving birth. The man, however, could be shown as athletic and engaging or old and experienced. These idealistic depictions would reflect the targeted image, such as the physically able king, or the tired king who works day and night for his people. People were depicted at the peak of their beauty and youth, in an attempt to remain so forever. However, in the Third Intermediate Period, scholars see a shifting in the artistic style representing women. A more rounded body type appeared, with larger, more drooping breasts and a thickened body. This depiction was no longer necessarily associated with the ageing of women. There was also a certain "type" to be followed. Women, and children, were represented with an artistic style that would link them to their husband or father. The most obvious example would be the Amarna Period. Akhenaten's Amarna Period hosted great changes in artistic style. However, the most distinctive part was how Nefertiti, his wife, and his kids were shown with the same body type as his, which was quite unique for that matter. There are depictions showing Nefertiti with a body so similar to Akhenaten's, that you couldn't tell which one of them it was; long chins, round waists, full buttocks, sunken cheekbones and full lips. But there are also other depictions showing Nefertiti completely different, with a feminine face and a slender shape. After the Amarna Period, elite women were occasionally shown with fuller breasts.

Divine image and religion

In the abundance of divinities in Egyptian mythology, there existed a large number of goddesses, as was also the case in Greece. By studying their symbolism one can learn the image that women had in the eyes of the ancient Egyptians. As with Greek divinities, many were related to one another, by blood or marriage, such as Isis and her sister Nephthys, both the respective wives of Osiris (the god of the dead) and of Set, themselves brothers.

Women and their image were most often associated with life and fertility. In the case of the goddess Isis, who was associated with many principles: as the wife of Osiris who was killed by his brother, she was connected to funeral rites. As a mother, she became the feminine protector, but above all the mother-creator, she who gives life. Through this goddess, the principles of life and death were closely linked. In effect, while she was associated with funeral rites, these rites were to prevent the deceased from submitting to a second death in the succeeding dimension, which explains among other things, the food found in abundance by archeologists in the tombs. On the other hand, life in its physical aspect meaningful only by death, because these principles are part of a movement of eternal new beginning that is then in a sense more spiritual, the movement of life, or eternal life. A symbol of the goddess is also the palm tree, the symbol of eternal life. She breathed the breath of eternal life to her dead husband.

The goddess represented the era's regard for women, because it was crucial to maintain the spirit in her image, it was this idea of eternal life and of maturity that Isis reflected, venerated as the Celestial Mother. It was in this role that Isis was arguably made the most important deity of Egyptian mythology. Her influence even extended to religions of different civilizations, where she would become identified under different names and where her cult grew, particularly in the Roman Empire.

The most influential goddesses were:
 Isis: goddess of magic and mysticism,
 Hathor: goddess of nourishment and love,
 Bastet: goddess protector of the home,
 Sekhmet: goddess of wrath

Priesthood
Women could become priests in Ancient Egypt. However, as was common in Ancient societies, there was no general rule for women's rights to become priests. Instead, the priesthood was different for each separate divinity depending on the local cult of each divinity. This meant that women could be accepted as priests for a specific divinity in one temple and not accepted in another, as was the case with men.

Priestess of Hathor
One of the most famed priesthoods for women in Ancient Egypt was the Priestess of Hathor or Prophetess of Hathor, which was the title of the Priestess of the goddess Hathor in the Temple of Dendera in Ancient Egypt.

God's Wives 

"God's Wife of Amun" was the highest-ranking priestess of the Amun cult. At the beginning of the New Kingdom, the title was associated with royalty, usually kings' wives or kings' mothers. The first royal wife to hold this title was Ahmose-Nefertari, wife of Ahmose I, who then passed it on to her daughter, Meritamen who then passed it on to Hatshepsut. Both Ahmose-Nefertari and Hatshepsut used this title as an alternative to King's Principal Wife which reflects the significance that lay behind the title. The title God's Wife was another title given to royal women in sacral roles. In the Nubian and Saite Periods, they built their own chapels and mortuary temples. In addition to God's Wife, these women had other titles such as Divine Adorer or God's Hand. Unlike revered women in other cultures, the concept of chastity wasn't relevant to the ancient Egyptians' religious practice.

Social and political position of women 

In many of ancient Egypt's artistic approaches, we see women supporting or clasping their husband, maybe even protecting them. So in some sense, the woman could be the protector, probably associated with the concept of protective goddesses. Women mingled in society, we see evidence of that where peasant women were depicted helping with the harvest; townswomen are shown as professional musicians, dancers, members of temple staff and party guests. 

So women weren't just traditional stay at home wives, but they contributed to society and sometimes even in untraditional ways. There are scenes of women in weaving workshops, and tomb inscriptions of women's professional involvement. Such titles could range from political to religious to funerary. Some titles inscribed on tombs were mainly honorific; to honor the women after they die. Some examples of titles are: Overseer of Female Physicians, Judge and Vizier, Director of the Dining Hall, and Overseer of Funerary Priests. 

Religious positions weren't limited to noblewomen as some would think, in fact, we see evidence of priestesses of major goddesses bearing humble titles like tenant farmer. As history moves from the Old Kingdom to the Middle Kingdom, we see less and less of women in authority which may suggest changes in political and social norms. In the New Kingdom, however, texts show that women had their own legal identity and could even purchase and inherit land without the need for male consent. 

During this period, women were portrayed in all shapes and sizes, where their status and wealth were reflected in the size of their statue. Idealistic portrayals were an important part of Egyptian art, mainly because they believed that these representations would follow them into eternity. Egyptian mothers were a significant part of ancient Egypt. Egyptian men, even those of the highest social class, often placed only their mother's names on their monuments. Egyptian mothers were more prominently displayed than the fathers, also in literature. The ancient Egyptians paid attention to size and quantity; large tombs indicated a significance of the deceased. 

Some queens of the early dynasties even commemorated tombs as large as their husbands'. The pair statue of Amenhotep III and his common-born wife, Queen Tiye, dominates a room at the Cairo Museum, showing the queen as of equal size as the king. Hatshepsut, unsatisfied with her status as second best to her father, took it to clarifying her divine conception, so as to legitimize her ruling as pharaoh by recording the miracle of her birth on the walls of the second terrace.

Influence of the image

Rediscovery of ancient Egypt during the era of Napoleon 

In 1798, Napoleon Bonaparte led a campaign in Egypt that would be a military fiasco, but which enabled him to return to France with drawings and observations by artists and scientists that he had brought on the expedition.

But it was in 1822 that Egypt became more open to researchers, the wider world developed a passion for ancient Egypt, and wanted to know more about its history and its culture.

The fascination with Egypt that followed, and with everything that concerned Antiquity, carried a powerful influence. In this era, in Paris, almost all fields of creativity were heavily inspired by the rediscoveries from Antiquity. The arts became redirected along this path, following the fashion for ancient Egypt down every esthetic route. In this way, clothing styles changed, and women during the Napoleonic Empire adopted styles associated with ancient Egyptian women, combined with the influence of Ancient Greece and Rome: corsets were abandoned (only temporarily), as well as petticoats, and the raised Empire waist was the popular dress silhouette. Dresses were lighter, and were decorated with motifs from Antiquity, for example palm trees, one of the symbols of the goddess Isis.

Modern images of women in ancient Egypt 

When women in ancient Egypt are evoked, the first image that comes to mind for most is that of Cleopatra, or more precisely, Cleopatra VII. Although having a Greek origin, it is she who would be associated with the image of women in ancient Egypt, for several generations. This has been in large part due to modern cinema, especially the films of the Golden Age of Hollywood.

During the 1950s and 1960s, a number of costume dramas were produced, putting on screen Egyptian women imagined during this era where filmmakers want to show glamour. In 1963, the glamorous image of Cleopatra was cemented for the public in the film Cleopatra directed by Joseph L. Mankiewicz, and portrayed by Liz Taylor.

This passion for the queen is explained by the tumultuous life that she lived, full of intrigues, romances (her two most famous lovers being Julius Caesar and Marc Antony), her power, and her tragic death (she died by suicide). In short, she fascinates, by her life and by what she did. Through her connection to ancient Egypt, she has an aura of mystery for spectators, the same aura that surrounds ancient Egypt and its esoteric aspects, the same mysteriousness linked in the popular imagination with ancient curses of mummies, or other secrets of the tombs. Presented this way, Egyptian women become a sort of seductress, fascinating because of a romanticized view of her.

As a sign of celebrity, this imagined Egypt has not only been the object of fantasies but has also been caricatured. The best-known of these caricatures today are those appearing in such media of popular culture as the Astérix comic books of René Goscinny and Albert Uderzo. Playing on the glamorous image created by cinema, the authors satirize the fascination that Cleopatra exercises on those around her, focusing especially on her nose and exaggerating her queenly status by depicting her as capricious and temperamental, far-removed from the ideal of the seductive woman so often imagined.

In a more general manner, this image of Egyptian women, forceful, behind a mysterious and magical veil, and exercising a seductive power, continues to this day, for example in the American series Stargate SG-1, or again in Luc Besson's film The Fifth Element (1997).

Fashion designers are also regularly inspired by the iconography of Egyptian women, who have become an esthetic point of reference.

Royal women (in chronological order) 

 First dynasty of Egypt
 Merneith, daughter of Djer, wife of Djet, mother of Den
 Third dynasty of Egypt
 Djefatnebti, wife of Huni
 Fourth dynasty of Egypt
 Meresankh I, second wife of Huni, mother of Sneferu
 Hetepheres I, wife of Sneferu, mother of Khufu
 Meritites I, wife of Khufu, mother of Kawab, Baufra, Djedefhor and Meresankh II
 Henutsen, second wife of Khufu, mother of Khufukhaf I and Khafre
 Nubet, fourth wife of Khufu, mother of Khentetenka, Djedefra and Hetepheres II
 Khamerernebti I, wife of Khafre, mother of Menkaure
 Khamerernebti II, second wife Khafre then wife of Menkaure
 Khentkaus I, wife of Shepseskaf then of Userkaf, mother of Neferirkare Kakai and Sahure
 Fifth Dynasty of Egypt
Nimaethap II unknown husband
 Eleventh dynasty of Egypt
 Neferu, wife of Intef II, mother of Intef III
 Iah, wife of Intef III, mother of Mentuhotep II
 Tem, first wife of Mentuhotep II, mother of Mentuhotep III
 Neferu, second wife and sister of Mentuhotep II
 Achaït or Ashayt, concubine of Mentuhotep II, also a priestess of the goddess Hathor
 Imi, wife of Mentuhotep III, mother of Mentuhotep IV
 Twelfth dynasty of Egypt
 Neferet or Nofret, wife of a priest in Thebes, Senousret, mother of Amenemhat I
 Neferitatjenen, principal wife of Amenemhat I, mother of Senusret I
 Dedyet, other wife of Amenemhat I, possibly also his sister
 Neferu III, wife of Senusret I, mother of Amenemhat II
 Itakaiet, daughter or wife Senusret I
 Neferusobek, Neferuptah, Nenseddjedet, daughters of Senusret I
 Khenemetneferhedjet I, daughter of Amenemhat II
 Neferet II, wife of Senusret II
 Khenemetneferhedjet I, wife of Senusret II, mother of Senusret III
 Sithathoryunet, daughter of Senusret II
 Mereret or Meriret or Merit, wife of Senusret III
 Sithathormerit, daughter of Senusret III
 Sobekneferu, daughter of Amenemhat III, wife of her own brother Amenemhat IV
 Thirteenth dynasty of Egypt
 Nubhotepti I, wife of Hor
 Senebhenas I, wife of Khendjer
 Senebhenas II and Neni, wives of Sobekhotep III
 Senebsen, wife of Neferhotep I
 Tjan, wife of Sobekhotep IV
 Aya, wife of Intef
 Sitmut, wife of Mentuhotep V
Fourteenth dynasty of Egypt
 Tati, wife of Sheshi
 Sixteenth dynasty of Egypt
 Mentuhotep, wife of Djehuti
 Seventeenth dynasty of Egypt
 Noubkhaes II, wife of Sobekemsaf I
 Sobekemsaf, wife of Antef VII
 Noubemhet, wife of Sobekemsaf II
 Tetisheri, daughter of Tienna and Neferu, wife of Senakhtenre Tao I
 Ahhotep I, daughter of Senakhtenre Tao I, sister and wife of Seqenenre Tao II
 Ahmose-Nefertari, daughter of Seqenenre Tao II and of Ahhotep I, sister and wife of Ahmose I, mother of Amenhotep I and Ahmose-Sipair
 Eighteenth dynasty of Egypt
 Ahmose-Meritamon daughter of Ahmose I and Ahmose-Nefertari, wife of her brother Amenhotep I
 Ahmes, possible sister of Amenhotep I, wife of Thutmose I, mother of Hatshepsut and Amenemes
 Mutnofret, second wife of Thutmose I, mother of Thutmose II
 Hatshepsut, daughter of Thutmose I and of Ahmes, wife of her half-brother Thutmose II, mother of Neferure and Merytre-Hatshepsut
 Isis, second wife of Thutmose II, mother of Thutmose III
 Mutemwiya, wife of Thutmose IV, mother of Amenhotep III
 Tiyi (wife of Amenhotep III), wife of Amenhotep III
 Nefertiti, wife of Akhenaton
 Nineteenth dynasty of Egypt
 Satre, wife of Ramses I, mother of Seti I
 Tuya, wife of Seti I
 Nefertari, wife of Ramses II
 Isetnofret, second wife of Ramses II, mother of Merenptah
 Twosret, wife of Seti II
 Ptolemaic dynasty of Egypt
 Berenice I, wife of Ptolemy I, mother of Arsinoe II and of Ptolemy II
 Arsinoe I, wife of Ptolemy II, mother of Ptolemy III
 Berenice II, daughter of Magas, King of Cyrene and of Arsinoe, wife of Demetrios the Just, brother of the King of Macedonia then of Ptolemy III, mother of Arsinoe III and of Ptolemy IV
 Cleopatra I, wife of Ptolemy V
 Cleopatra II, wife of Ptolemy VI then of Ptolemy VIII
 Cleopatra III, second wife of Ptolemy VIII
 Cleopatra IV of Egypt, wife of Ptolemy IX
 Cleopatra V, second wife of Ptolemy IX
 Berenice III, wife of Ptolemy X
 Cleopatra VI of Egypt, wife of Ptolemy XII
 Berenice IV, second wife of Ptolemy XII
 Cleopatra VII, wife of Ptolemy XIII then of Ptolemy XIV, Julius Caesar and Marc Antony, mother of Ptolemy XV
 Cleopatra VIII, daughter of Cleopatra VII and Marc Antony, wife of Juba II, King of Numidia

See also 

Beauty and cosmetics in ancient Egypt
 Women in Egypt

Bibliography 
 Joyce Tyldesley, Daughters of Isis: Women of Ancient Egypt, Penguin (1995) 
 Gay Robins, Women in Ancient Egypt, Harvard University Press (1993) 
 Carolyn Graves-Brown, Dancing for Hathor: Women in Ancient Egypt, Continuum (2010)

Sources 
 Christiane Desroches Noblecourt, La femme au temps des pharaons, Stock, 1986
 Pierre Montet, La vie quotidienne en Égypte au temps des Ramsès, Hachette, 1946

References

External links 

Hatshepsut: from Queen to Pharaoh, an exhibition catalog from The Metropolitan Museum of Art (fully available online as PDF)

Ancient Egypt
Ancient Egyptian women
Egypt